The Percival Prince is a British light transport of the early postwar period. It was a twin-engine, high-wing, cantilever monoplane of all-metal stressed-skin construction; the undercarriage was of retractable, tricycle type.

Development

The design of the Prince continued from the solitary Merganser. Further development of the type led to the Survey Prince survey aircraft and the Sea Prince. An improved version of the Prince 3 with an increased wingspan and engine and undercarriage modifications was developed for the Royal Air Force as the Percival Pembroke.

Operational history

The Prince was produced in six versions for the civil market. Several examples were operated as executive aircraft including Standard Motors and Shell Oil. Three aircraft were used by the UK Ministry of Civil Aviation as airport facilities checking aircraft.

The Sea Prince operated in two roles: in T.Mk.1 form it served as a navigation and anti-submarine trainer; the C.Mks. 1 and 2 were flown in the transport role. However, these were land planes and not COD (carrier on board delivery) aircraft.
Sea Princes operated in both roles from 1954 to 1972 and as a navigation trainer until 1978, when it was replaced by the Handley Page Jetstream

Variants

 P.50 Prince 1 – prototype based on Merganser with modified fin and undercarriage and two 520 hp Alvis Leonides 501/4 engine, one built.
 P.50 Prince 2 – As Prince 1 with sloping windscreen, stronger main spar, five built.
 P.50 Prince 3 – As Prince 2 with Alvis Leonides 502/4 engine and lengthened nose on some aircraft, 12 built.
 P.50 Prince 4 – Conversions to Alvis Leonides 503 engines, ten converted.
 P.50 Prince 5 – original designation of the Percival President.
 P.50 Prince 6 – Conversions to Alvis Leonides 504 engines.
 P.54 Survey Prince – Prince 2 with lengthened transparent nose and camera hatches, six built.

 P.50 Sea Prince C1 – Prince 2 for Royal Navy use, three built.
 P.57 Sea Prince T1 – Prince 3 with long nose housing radar, twin wheeled main undercarriage and lengthened engine nacelles for navigation and anti-submarine training, 41 built.
 P.57 Sea Prince C2 – Transport version of Sea Prince T1, four built.

Operators

Civil operators
 
 
 Brunei Shell Petroleum Company
 
 Aeronorte

Military operators

 Royal Australian Air Force – Three Princes were in service with the RAAF from 1952 to 1957. The aircraft were used for communications and support duties at the Weapons Research Establishment, Woomera, South Australia.
 Air Trials Unit

 Thai Air Force – One Survey Prince aircraft.
 Thai Army – One Survey Prince aircraft.

 Fleet Air Arm
 700 Naval Air Squadron
 702 Naval Air Squadron
 727 Naval Air Squadron
 744 Naval Air Squadron
 750 Naval Air Squadron
 781 Naval Air Squadron
 831 Naval Air Squadron
 Royal Naval Reserve
 1830 Squadron RNVR
 1840 Squadron RNVR
 1841 Squadron RNVR
 1844 Squadron RNVR

Surviving aircraft
Thailand
 T1-1/98 – Prince 3A on display at the Royal Thai Air Force Museum in Bangkok.

United Kingdom
 P50/46 – Prince 6E on display with the Speke Aerodrome Heritage Group in Liverpool, Merseyside.
 WP313 – Sea Prince T.1 in storage at the Fleet Air Arm Museum in Yeovilton, Somerset.
 WF128 – Sea Prince T.1 on display at the Norfolk and Suffolk Aviation Museum in Flixton, Suffolk.
 WP309 – Sea Prince T.1 on display at the Solway Aviation Museum in Irthington, Cumbria.
 WP308 – Sea Prince T.1 on display at the Gatwick Aviation Museum in Charlwood, Surrey.
 WF122 – Sea Prince T.1 under restoration with the Ulster Aviation Society in Lisburn, Antrim. It was formerly on display at Aeroventure and operated by 750 Naval Air Squadron.
 WP321 – Sea Prince T.1 on display at the South Wales Aviation Museum in St Athan, Glamorgan.

United States of America

 N206UP - Prince 2 c/n P50/10, on display in private garden in Antelope Acres, California

Specifications (Sea Prince T.1)

See also

Notes

Bibliography
 Grant, Robert S. "Canadian Prince". Air Enthusiast, No. 55, Autumn 1994, p. 13. 
Jackson, A.J. British Civil Aircraft 1919–1972: Volume III. London:Putnam, 1988. .
 Silvester, John. "Call to Arms: The Percival Sea Prince and Pembroke". Air Enthusiast, No. 55, Autumn 1994, pp. 56–61. 
 Silvester, John. Percival and Hunting Aircraft. Leicester: Midland Counties Publications 1987. .
Thetford, Owen, British Naval Aircraft since 1912. London:Putnam, 1978. .

External links 

Flight – Proving flights for tropical use

Prince
1940s British airliners
1940s British civil utility aircraft
1940s British military transport aircraft
1940s British military trainer aircraft
High-wing aircraft
Aircraft first flown in 1948
Twin piston-engined tractor aircraft